M. portoricensis may refer to:

 Machaonia portoricensis, a flowering plant
 Magnolia portoricensis, a magnolia native to Puerto Rico
 Marasmius portoricensis, a mushroom-forming fungus
 Melanerpes portoricensis, a woodpecker endemic to Puerto Rico
 Mimetus portoricensis, a pirate spider
 Moodnopsis portoricensis, a snout moth